The High Value Manufacturing Catapult (HVM Catapult) is a group of manufacturing research centres in the United Kingdom, which forms part of the Catapult centres initiative.

History
Catapult centres were set up by Innovate UK (formerly the Technology Strategy Board).

The HVM Catapult was created with £140m of government funding and was the first Catapult centre to open, in October 2011. In 2016, manufacturing employed 2.6m people in the UK, and contributed 11% of GDP.

Structure and funding
The HVM Catapult has offices at the Blythe Valley Business Park, off junction 4 of the M42 in Cheswick Green, Solihull, West Midlands. It is a Private company limited by guarantee and its members are seven national centres:

 Advanced Forming Research Centre – at the University of Strathclyde
 Advanced Manufacturing Research Centre – University of Sheffield
 Centre for Process Innovation – Redcar, Sedgefield, Darlington and Glasgow
 Manufacturing Technology Centre – near Coventry
 National Composites Centre – at Bristol and Bath Science Park
 Nuclear Advanced Manufacturing Research Centre – University of Sheffield
 WMG, University of Warwick

The company applies for grant funding from Innovate UK, on behalf of itself and its members, and makes grants to the members with the funding received. In the year to March 2017, £89m of grant funding was received alongside £67m collaborative income from the private sector; at 31 March 2017 there were 2,114 employees in total at the centres.

In August 2018, each of the centres received allocations from a package of new government funding.

References

External links
 

2011 establishments in the United Kingdom
Catapult centres
Engineering research institutes
Government agencies established in 2011
Manufacturing in the United Kingdom